Kevin Sherrer (born March 19, 1973) is an American football coach and former player who is currently the linebacker coach at  Georgia Tech. Before that was the  
 linebackers coach for the New York Giants.  He also previously served as the defensive coordinator at the University of Tennessee (2018–2019), the outside linebackers coach at Georgia (2014–2017), the defensive coordinator at South Alabama (2013), the Director of Player Development at Alabama (2010–2012), and as a high school assistant coach at Hoover High School, Spain Park High School, and Tuscaloosa County.  He played college football at Alabama.

Playing career

A native of Oneonta, Alabama, Sherrer played tight end and linebacker at Cleveland High School in nearby Cleveland.  He was named All-State in 1990.  Sherrer played tight end at Alabama from 1993 to 1995, lettering in the latter year.  He graduated with a degree in physical education in 1996, and earned his master's degree in higher education administration from Alabama in 2000.

Coaching career

Tuscaloosa County High School
Sherrer began coaching as an assistant at Tuscaloosa County High School in 1996, and helped the team win the state championship during his second year on the staff in 1997.

Alabama
In 1998, he returned to the University of Alabama, serving as a graduate assistant on the staff of head coach Mike DuBose.  During his tenure as a GA with the Tide, he assisted with defense, scout teams, and recruiting.

Spain Park High School
From 2001 to 2004, Sherrer served as defensive backs coach at Spain Park High School in Hoover, Alabama.  During his four years with Spain Park, the team steadily improved, finishing with a 9-4 record and reaching the state quarterfinals in 2004.

Hoover High School
In 2005, Sherrer joined the staff at Hoover High School, reuniting with college teammate (and future collegiate coaching colleague) Jeremy Pruitt.  He initially served as an assistant with Hoover before taking over as defensive coordinator in 2007 following Pruitt's departure.

Return to Alabama
Sherrer served as Director of Player Development at Alabama under Nick Saban from 2010 to 2012. During this time he won two national championships with the Crimson Tide.

South Alabama
In 2013, he was hired as the defensive coordinator and defensive backs coach at South Alabama.  During his lone season with the Jaguars, the team finished second in the Sun Belt Conference in total defense (384 yards per game) and scoring defense (25 points per game).

Georgia
In 2014, Sherrer joined Mark Richt's staff at Georgia, and remained on staff as the outside linebackers coach after Richt was replaced by Kirby Smart following the 2015 season.  Players Sherrer coached at Georgia included Tae Crowder, Leonard Floyd, and Jordan Jenkins.

Tennessee
In December 2017, Sherrer was hired as the defensive coordinator at Tennessee, where his long-time colleague Pruitt had been named head coach. In  Sherrer’s  second season on  Jeremy Pruitt’s staff. Sherrer  served as the team’s special teams coordinator in addition to being the teams inside linebackers coach after  spending his first season as co-defensive coordinator and inside linebackers coach.

New York Giants
On January 25, 2020, it was announced that Sherrer would become the inside linebackers coach for the New York Giants. Sherrer assumed outside linebackers coach duties with the team after Bret Bielema left to become the head coach for Illinois on December 19, 2020.
It was announced prior to the 2021 season that he would continue to coach the entire linebacking core. He was let go after the 2021 season.

Georgia Tech
On January 4, 2023, it was announced that Sherrer was hired to be the linebackers coach and co-defensive coordinator for Georgia Tech under head coach Brent Key.

Family
Sherrer and his wife, Carrie, have twin sons, Kaleb and Kyle.

While coaching at Georgia in 2015 his sister Rasha was found murdered.

References

External links
South Alabama Jaguars bio
New York Giants bio

1973 births
Living people
Alabama Crimson Tide football players
Alabama Crimson Tide football coaches
American football tight ends
Georgia Bulldogs football coaches
High school football coaches in Alabama
New York Giants coaches
People from Blount County, Alabama
Players of American football from Alabama
South Alabama Jaguars football coaches
Sportspeople from Alabama
Tennessee Volunteers football coaches